Tamasidava was a Dacian town mentioned by Ptolemy.

See also 
 Dacian davae
 List of ancient cities in Thrace and Dacia
 Dacia
 Roman Dacia

References

Ancient

Modern

Further reading 

Dacian towns